NZI or New Zealand Insurance is a major insurance company in New Zealand. NZI was formed in Auckland by 1859 as the New Zealand Insurance Company and is one of New Zealand's largest and longest-serving fire and general insurance brands. 

In a nation where almost every building was wooden NZI expanded quickly.
Timeline
 1861 opened Wellington and London offices
 1860s established a New Zealand wide network then a similar network in Australia
 1870s offices in the United States
 1880s agencies in Asian countries
 1881 insured first shipment of frozen meat to London
 1886 Argentina offices
 1890s South Africa
 1906 San Francisco earthquake, one of few insurers able to pay all claims in full
 1912 an underwriter of the Titanic

NZI merged with South British Insurance in 1981; the two companies had been equally matched rivals and were virtually the same size, but with different emphasis on the types of business they held. The new company formed a parent, New Zealand South British Group Ltd, which maintained both brands concurrently before changing to the NZI Corporation in 1984 when the South British brand was phased out. General Accident bought NZI in 1989. In January 2003, Insurance Australia Group acquired NZI when purchasing the general insurance business of Aviva, a successor of General Accident. NZI is now a subsidiary of IAG New Zealand.

NZI focuses on providing products to the intermediated market, i.e. brokers and banks.

It was the title sponsor of the Wellington Sevens event in the IRB Sevens World Series for international rugby sevens teams and TVNZ business programme NZI Business.

References

External links
 Company website

Insurance companies of New Zealand
Companies based in Auckland
Financial services companies established in 1859
New Zealand companies established in 1859
1981 mergers and acquisitions
2003 mergers and acquisitions